Llandecwyn railway station serves the rural area around Llandecwyn on the estuary of the Afon Dwyryd in Gwynedd, Wales.

History

British Rail requested the permission of the Secretary of State for Transport to close Llandecwyn and three other Cambrian Coast stations (namely Abererch, Tygwyn and Tonfanau) during the mid-1990s. Their winter 1995/96 timetable featured only two northbound and three southbound trains Mondays to Saturdays, with a note that the service may be withdrawn before 1 June 1996. The station was retained and service levels have since increased.

The station was completely reconstructed during summer 2014, as part of the scheme of works to replace nearby Pont Briwet and now consists of a small glass shelter and a short concrete platform capable of accommodating two carriages.

Services
Trains call only on request.

Sources

External links

 RAILSCOT on Aberystwith and Welsh Coast Railway

Railway stations in Gwynedd
DfT Category F2 stations
Former Great Western Railway stations
Railway stations in Great Britain opened in 1930
Railway stations served by Transport for Wales Rail
Railway request stops in Great Britain
Talsarnau